The 1998–99 National League 1, sponsored by Jewson, was the twelfth full season of rugby union within the third tier of the English league system.

Structure
The league consisted of fourteen teams, playing each other on a home and away basis to make a total of twenty-six matches for each team. There were two promotion places with the top two teams promoted to the 1999–2000 Allied Dunbar Premiership Two. Two teams were relegated to either National League 2 North or South, depending on geographical location.

Participating teams and locations 

Ten of the clubs participating in last seasons competition. To make up the numbers two of the teams (Birmingham & Solihull and Manchester) were promoted from National 2 North, and two from National 2 South (Camberley and Henley) were also promoted.

League table

Sponsorship
National League 1 is sponsored by the building suppliers, Jewson.

See also
 English Rugby Union Leagues
 English rugby union system
 Rugby union in England

References

Nat
National League 1 seasons